The Roman Catholic Diocese of Imperatriz is a suffragan Latin diocese in the Ecclesiastical province of the Metropolitan of São Luís do Maranhão in northeastern Brazil.

Its cathedral episcopal see is Catedral Nossa Senhora da Fátima, dedicated to Our Lady of Fatima, in the city of Imperatriz, Maranhão state.

History 
 Established on 27 June 1987 as Diocese of Imperatriz, on territory split off from the Diocese of Carolina.

Statistics 
As per 2014, it pastorally served 414,000 Catholics (79.9% of 518,000 total) on 25,958 km² in 27 parishes and 2 missions with 43 priests (29 diocesan, 14 religious), 1 deacon, 65 lay religious (19 brothers, 46 sisters) and 7 seminarians .

Bishops
(all Roman rite)

Episcopal ordinaries
Suffragan Bishops of Imperatriz 
 Affonso Felippe Gregory (1987.07.16 – retired 2005.08.03), also President of Caritas Internationalis (1991 – 1999); died 2008; previously Titular Bishop of Drusiliana (1979.08.02 – 1987.07.16) as Auxiliary Bishop of São Sebastião do Rio de Janeiro (Brazil) (1979.08.02 – 1987.07.16)
 Gilberto Pastana de Oliveira (2005.08.03 – 2017.04.19), also Coadjutor Bishop of Crato (Brazil) (2016.05.18 – 2016.12.28), succeeding as Bishop of Crato (2016.12.28 – ...)
 Vilson Basso, Dehonians (S.C.I.) (2017.04.19 – ...), previously Bishop of Caxias do Maranhão (Brazil) (2010.03.19 – 2017.04.19).

Other priest of this diocese who became bishops
Francisco Lima Soares, appointed Bishop of Carolina, Maranhão in 2018

See also 
 List of Catholic dioceses in Brazil

Sources and external links 
 GCatholic.org - data for all sections
 Catholic Hierarchy

Roman Catholic dioceses in Brazil
Religious organizations established in 1987
Roman Catholic Ecclesiastical Province of São Luís do Maranhão
Roman Catholic dioceses and prelatures established in the 20th century